SCH (Subcarrier to Horizontal) phase refers to the phase relationship between the leading edge of horizontal sync (at the 50% amplitude point) and the zero crossings of the color burst (by extrapolating the color burst to the leading edge of sync). The error is referred to as SCH phase and is expressed in degrees of subcarrier phase. For PAL, the definition of SCH phase is slightly different due to the more complicated relationship between the sync and subcarrier frequencies — the SCH phase relationship for a given line repeats only once every eight fields. Therefore, PAL SCH phase is defined, per EBU Technical Statement D 23-1984 (E), as “the phase of the +U component of the color burst extrapolated to the half-amplitude point of the leading edge of the synchronizing pulse of line 1 of field 1.”

SCH phase is important when merging two or more video signals. To avoid color shifts or “picture jumps,” the video signals must have the same horizontal, vertical, and subcarrier timing and the phases must be closely matched. To achieve these timing constraints, the video signals must have the same SCH phase relationship since the horizontal sync and subcarrier are continuous signals with a defined relationship. It is common for an encoder to allow adjustment of the SCH phase to simplify merging two or more video signals. Maintaining proper SCH phase is also important since NTSC and PAL decoders may monitor the SCH phase to determine which color field is being decoded.

Display technology